Amphidromus flavus is a species of air-breathing land snail, a terrestrial pulmonate gastropod mollusk in the family Camaenidae.

Distribution
Distribution of Amphidromus areolatus include Vientiane Province and Luang Prabang Province in Laos, Thailand and Cambodia.

Description

References

 Thach, N. N. (2018). New shells of South Asia. Seashells-Landsnails-Freshwater Shells. 3 New Genera, 132 New Species & Subspecies. 48HRBooks Company, Akron, Ohio, USA. 173 pp.
 Maassen, W. J. M. (2001). A preliminary checklist of the non-marine molluscs of West-Malaysia: "a Hand List". De Kreukel, Extra Editie 2001. 1–155. page(s): 118

External links 
 Pfeiffer, L. (1861). Descriptions of new land-shells, in the collection of H. Cuming, Esq. Proceedings of the Zoological Society of London. 29 (12–13): 190–196. London
 Pilsbry, H. A. (1900). Australasian Bulimulidae: Bothriembryon, Placostylus. Helicidae: Amphidromus. In: Tryon, G. W. & Pilsbry, H. A. (eds.). Manual of conchology; structural and systematic. With illustrations of the species. Second series: Pulmonata. (2) 13: 1-253, pls. 1-72. Philadelphia
 Inkhavilay, K., Sutcharit, C., Bantaowong, U., Chanabun, R., Siriwut, W., Srisonchai, R., Pholyotha, A., Jirapatrasilp, P. & Panha, S. (2019). Annotated checklist of the terrestrial molluscs from Laos (Mollusca, Gastropoda). ZooKeys. 834: 1–166.

flavus
Gastropods described in 1861